Semseyite  is a rarely occurring sulfosalt mineral and is part of the class of lead antimony sulfides. It crystallizes in the monoclinic system with the chemical composition Pb9Sb8S21. The mineral forms dark gray to black aggregates.

Etymology and history
Semseyite was first described for an occurrence in the Felsöbánya mine in Baia Sprie, Romania in 1881 by József Sándor Krenner (1839–1920). The mineral was named after Hungarian mineralogist Andor von Semsey (1833–1923).

Occurrence 
Semseyite forms in hydrothermal solutions at temperatures between 300 and 350 °C. It occurs in association with bournonite, jamesonite, sphalerite, zinkenite, sorbyite, guettardite, jordanite, diaphorite, galena, pyrite, chalcopyrite, tetrahedrite, arsenopyrite and siderite.

Images

References

Lead minerals
Antimony minerals
Sulfide minerals
Monoclinic minerals
Minerals in space group 15